XCOM: The Board Game is a 2015 science-fiction themed cooperative board game, set in the XCOM universe, published by Fantasy Flight Games and designed by Eric M. Lang.

Honors 

 2015 Spiel der Spiele Griffin Scroll Winner

Reviews
 Casus Belli (v4, Issue 14 - Mar/Apr 2015)

References

External links 

 

Board games introduced in 2015
Cooperative board games
Licensed board games
XCOM
Science fiction board games